Stephen Morgan (January 25, 1854 – February 9, 1928) was a U.S. Representative from Ohio.

Early life and career 
Born in Jackson County, Ohio, Morgan attended the common schools, Central College, Worthington, Ohio, and the National Normal University, Lebanon, Ohio.
He taught in the public schools of Jackson County for a number of years.
School examiner for nine years and principal of Oak Hill Academy for fifteen years.

Congress 
Morgan was elected as a Republican to the Fifty-sixth, Fifty-seventh, and Fifty-eighth Congresses (March 4, 1899 – March 3, 1905).
He was an unsuccessful candidate for reelection in 1904 to the Fifty-ninth Congress.

Retirement and death
He moved to Columbus, Ohio, and retired from public life.

He died at Magnetic Springs, Ohio, February 9, 1928.
He was interred in Horeb Cemetery, near Oak Hill, Ohio.

Sources

1854 births
1928 deaths
People from Jackson County, Ohio
National Normal University alumni
Republican Party members of the United States House of Representatives from Ohio